Eugène Paul Louis Schueller (20 March 1881 – 23 August 1957) was a French pharmacist and entrepreneur who was the founder of L'Oréal, the world's leading company in cosmetics and beauty. He was one of the founders of modern advertising.

Founding of L'Oréal 
As a young French chemist of Alsatian paternal origin, Schueller graduated in 1904 from the Institut de Chimie Appliquée de Paris (now Chimie ParisTech). Schueller developed in 1907 an innovative hair-color formula, which he called Oréale. He formulated and manufactured his own products, and sold them to Parisian hairdressers.
In 1909, he registered his company, the Société Française de Teintures Inoffensives pour Cheveux, the future L'Oréal. The guiding principles of the company that would become L'Oréal were put into place from the start: research and innovation in the interest of beauty.

Support for fascism 
During the early twentieth century, Schueller provided financial support and held meetings for La Cagoule at L'Oréal headquarters. La Cagoule was a violent French fascist-leaning, antisemitic and anti-communist group whose leader formed a political party Mouvement Social Révolutionnaire (MSR, Social Revolutionary Movement) which in Occupied France supported the Vichy collaboration with the conquerors from Nazi Germany.

L'Oréal hired several members of the group as executives after World War II, such as Jacques Corrèze, who served as CEO of the US operation. This involvement was extensively researched by Michael Bar-Zohar in his book, Bitter Scent.

Family 
Schueller's daughter, Liliane Bettencourt, was the widow of André Bettencourt with whom she had one daughter, Françoise Bettencourt Meyers, chairwoman of L'Oréal's board of directors and according to Bloomberg Billionaires Index the richest woman in the world and the 12th richest person in the world, with a net worth of USD 94.9 Billion as of January 2022. Françoise Meyers is married to Jean-Pierre Meyers, whose rabbi grandfather was murdered in Auschwitz, a Nazi concentration camp. In 2017, Liliane Bettencourt was the wealthiest woman in the world, with holdings estimated at US$39.5 billion.

Legacy
The head office of L'Oréal in Clichy, Hauts-de-Seine is named Centre Eugène Schueller.

References

External links

 Official website of L'Oréal
 Forbes article on L'Oréal
 
 Book Review of Bitter Scent

1881 births
1957 deaths
Businesspeople from Paris
20th-century French chemists
French cosmetics businesspeople
French fascists
History of cosmetics
L'Oréal people
French anti-communists
Chevaliers of the Légion d'honneur
French people of German descent
French company founders
French collaborators with Nazi Germany